Great Hamston is a small hamlet and farm in the Vale of Glamorgan in south Wales. It lies off the A4226 road (Five Mile Lane). The River Waycock flows through the hamlet and the Goldsland Brook joins this stream from the east just to the northeast of Great Hamston. The Hamston Pond Cottage is let out to tourists. Just to the north is the Aqua farm, Dyffryn Springs, which is a noted commercial fishing spot for trout in the county and the hamlet also contains an allotment. Great Hamston Farm has a distinctive white tower which can be viewed on Bing Maps Birdseye view. The lane to Goldsland and Wenvoe to the east contains the Old Wallace Farm and the New Wallace Farm.

References

Villages in the Vale of Glamorgan
Farms in the Vale of Glamorgan